Santa Clara-a-Nova e Gomes Aires is a civil parish in the municipality of Almodôvar, Portugal. It was formed in 2013 by the merger of the former parishes Santa Clara-a-Nova and Gomes Aires. The population in 2011 was 955, in an area of 173.81 km2.

References

Freguesias of Almodôvar